Lancelot Holliday Richardson (1 April 1899 – 22 September 1958) was an English footballer. His regular position was as a goalkeeper. He was born in Tow Law, County Durham. He played for South Shields, Chopwell, Manchester United, Reading and Instituto Atlético Central Córdoba.

External links
profile

1899 births
1958 deaths
English footballers
Manchester United F.C. players
South Shields F.C. (1889) players
Reading F.C. players
People from Tow Law
Footballers from County Durham
Association football goalkeepers